2047 Smetana, provisional designation , is a bright Hungaria asteroid and synchronous binary system from the innermost regions of the asteroid belt, approximately 3.5 kilometers in diameter. It was discovered on 26 October 1971, by Czech astronomer Luboš Kohoutek at Bergedorf Observatory in Hamburg, Germany. The asteroid was named after Czech composer Bedřich Smetana. Its sub-kilometer sized minor-planet moon was discovered in 2012.

Classification and orbit 

Smetana is a bright member of the Hungaria family, which form the innermost dense concentration of asteroids in the Solar System. It orbits the Sun in the inner main-belt at a distance of 1.9–1.9 AU once every 2 years and 7 months (936 days). Its orbit has an eccentricity of 0.00 and an inclination of 25° with respect to the ecliptic. The asteroid's observation arc begins with its official discovery observation at Bergedorf, with no precoveries taken, and no prior identifications made.

Physical characteristics 

Smetana is an assumed E-type asteroid.

Lightcurves 

Between 2006 and 2012, several rotational lightcurves of Smetana were obtained from photometric observations by American astronomer Brian Warner at his Palmer Divide Observatory and CS3–Palmer Divide Station in Colorado and California, respectively. Lightcurve analysis gave a rotation period between 2.4801 and 2.498 hours with a brightness variation of between 0.12 and 0.16 magnitude.

Satellite 

During Warner's photometric observations in 2012, it was revealed that Smetana is a synchronous binary asteroid with an orbiting minor-planet moon. The satellite, designated , orbits its primary every 22.43 hours and measures approximately 0.63 kilometers in diameter. However the binary status of Smetana has not yet been confirmed unambiguously, since observations in 2016 could not clearly detect any mutual occultation and eclipsing events.

Diameter and albedo 

According to the surveys carried out by the NEOWISE mission of NASA's Wide-field Infrared Survey Explorer, Smetana measures 3.131 kilometers in diameter and its surface has an albedo of 0.544. The Collaborative Asteroid Lightcurve Link assumes an albedo of 0.30 – a compromise value between 0.4 and 0.2, corresponding to the Hungaria asteroids both as family and orbital group – and calculates a diameter of 3.85 kilometers with an absolute magnitude of 14.0.

Naming 

This minor planet was named for the Czech national composer Bedřich Smetana (1824–1884), best known for the opera The Bartered Bride, the cycle of six symphonic poems My homeland and the string quartet From my life. The official  was published by the Minor Planet Center on 1 July 1979.

Notes

References

External links 
 Asteroids with Satellites, Robert Johnston, johnstonsarchive.net
 Asteroid Lightcurve Database (LCDB), query form (info )
 Dictionary of Minor Planet Names, Google books
 Asteroids and comets rotation curves, CdR – Observatoire de Genève, Raoul Behrend
 Discovery Circumstances: Numbered Minor Planets (1)-(5000) – Minor Planet Center
 
 

002047
Discoveries by Luboš Kohoutek
Named minor planets
002047
19711026
2047